Meelis Kivisild (born 28 July 1990) is an Estonian volleyball player. He was a member of the Estonian national team from 2011 to 2015 and represented his country at the 2011 European Volleyball Championships.

He started his professional career in club Selver Tallinn.

References

Living people
1990 births
Estonian men's volleyball players